Cannonball is a British/Canadian adventure drama series starring  Paul Birch and William Campbell, and aired on CBC Television in Canada, ABC Weekend TV in the United Kingdom, and in syndication in the United States. Produced by Normandie Productions and ITC Entertainment, the series' interiors were filmed at Canadian Film Industries Limited, a studio in Canada. Exteriors were shot in and around Toronto.

The series is one of the few ITC productions to air on ABC Weekend TV in the UK. Because Associated TeleVision (ATV) owners of ITC, also ran the London weekend and Midlands weekdays ITV companies, they tended to hold the rights for ITC series in order to show each one in the Midlands (where ABC was the weekend operator) during the week. The series aired from October 6, 1958 to July 13, 1959, for 39 episodes in black-and-white.

Synopsis
The series follows the adventures of Mike Malone (Paul Birch), whose nickname is 'Cannonball', and Jerry Austin (William Campbell), two truckers who haul cargo across the US and Canada for the fictitious Toronto-based C&A Transport Company Ltd. The truck depicted is believed a GMC Model 950 COE (cab-over engine) diesel tractor built and sold in the same decade by General Motors. The supporting cast includes Beth Lockerbie as Mary Malone, Mike's wife, and Beth Morris as Ginny Malone and Steve Barringer as Butch Malone, the couple's two children. Howard Milsom appears as C&A Transport Company Ltd.'s dispatcher Harry Butler.

The duo's adventures come to an end in the series's final episode, "Tunnel Vision". Austin, who is Malone's co-driver on the truck, has an opportunity to go back and finish college. Malone knows this but realizes Austin will not take the opportunity because it will break up their partnership. In his yearly medical check up, Malone pretends to have tunnel vision (lack of peripheral vision) which means he no longer qualifies to drive trucks. This frees Austin who is able to finish his college education.

Main cast
Paul Birch as Cannonball Mike Malone
William Campbell as Jerry Austin
Beth Lockerbie as Mary Malone
Beth Morris as Ginny Malone
Steve Barringer as Butch Malone
Howard Milsom as Harry Butler

Episode list
The original production order appears to be lost and all that remains is a partial list based upon Canadian Broadcasting Corporation and ITV air dates. As titles were not shown on-screen, these titles may be speculative.

 "The Runaway Truck"
 "Pills"
 "Nitro Haul"
 "Small Cargo"
 "The Big Ambulance"
 "Mark Time"
 "The Necklace"
 "Shock"
 "The Attack"
 "The Girl Reporter"
 "Butch"
 "Little Old Man"
 "Sauce for the Goose"
 "The Girl at Joe's Place"
 "Nanette"
 "Lil's Cafe"
 "The Hostage"
 "Fallout"
 "Marooned"
 "Undercover"
 "Vendetta"
 "The Has-been"
 "The Flying Dutchman"
 "Rodeo"
 "Trip to Buffalo"
 "Wild Party"
 "Driving School"
 "Eyewitness"
 "Ginny"
 "Racket"
 "Green-eyed Monster"
 "Sights on Safety"
 "Moose Hunt"
 "Big Buck"
 "Willy"
 "The Dog"
 "Snake Eyes"
 "The Iron Lung"
 "Tunnel Eyes"

Theme music 
The Cannonball TV series had a theme  that opened and closed each episode.  The words and music were written and performed by the  American country artist Merle Haggard.

References

External links

 TV.com entry
 Classic TV Archive information
 Cannonball Intro
  
Cannonball - Canadian Communication Foundation
Queen's University Directory of CBC Television Series: Cannonball
Episodes of Cannonball on YouTube-Starring Paul Birch and William Campbell

1958 British television series debuts
1959 British television series endings
1958 Canadian television series debuts
1959 Canadian television series endings
1950s British drama television series
1950s Canadian drama television series
British adventure television series
Canadian adventure television series
Black-and-white British television shows
Black-and-white Canadian television shows
CBC Television original programming
English-language television shows
First-run syndicated television programs in the United States
Television shows filmed in Toronto
Television shows produced by ABC Weekend TV
Television series by ITC Entertainment
Works about trucks